Kolon Industries is a Korean chemical and textile manufacturing company. It was founded in 1957 as Korea Nylon Inc., an early manufacturer in the Korean nylon industry. It has since expanded to produce chemicals, other materials and fashion. In 2015 Kolon Industries opened a shopping mall built with shipping containers, the first of its kind in South Korea. It has a US subsidiary, Kolon USA Inc., selling polyester film and nylon film.

Kolon Industries was the defendant in the lawsuit DuPont v. Kolon Industries, about the alleged theft of trade secrets concerning Kevlar. The lawsuit was settled in 2015, with damages of US$275 million being paid to DuPont. The company also pleaded guilty to a federal charge of conspiracy to convert trade secrets, for which they will pay $85 million in criminal fines.

References

External links

  

Chemical companies of South Korea
Companies based in Daegu
Companies listed on the Korea Exchange
Chemical companies established in 1957
South Korean brands
South Korean companies established in 1957